Lolham is a hamlet in the City of Peterborough in England, located between Peterborough and Stamford on the border of Cambridgeshire and Lincolnshire. Lolham is located to the west of Maxey and to the south of West Deeping and is surrounded by the River Welland and Maxey Cut. There are eight residential properties in Lolham, which include Lolham Hall, a Grade II listed building. The main London-to-Edinburgh railway (the East Coast Main Line) runs to the west of Lolham. 

The Roman road now called King Street crossed the Welland floodplain here. Lolham is known for its nine bridges that run north across two railway crossings from Helpston to West Deeping. Lolham Bridges is/are a Grade II* listed building. John Clare described the crossings in his poem called "The Flood":

On Lolham Brigs in wild and lonely mood
I've seen the winter floods their gambols play
Through each old arch that trembled while I stood
Bent o'er its wall to watch the dashing spray.

References

Hamlets in Cambridgeshire
Geography of Peterborough